Cursolo-Orasso was a comune (municipality) in the Province of Verbano-Cusio-Ossola in the Italian region Piedmont, located about  northeast of Turin and about  north of Verbania, on the border with Switzerland. The municipality consisted of the villages of Cursolo and Orasso.

On 1 January 2019 the municipalities of Cursolo-Orasso, Cavaglio-Spoccia and Falmenta merged into the municipality of Valle Cannobina.

Cursolo-Orasso bordered the following municipalities: Cavaglio-Spoccia, Cossogno, Gurro, Malesco, Miazzina, Palagnedra (Switzerland), Re.

Double sunrise and sunset
Orasso sees two sunrises and two sunsets during the winter. Between 25 November and 17 January, Mount Riga temporarily blocks daylight, causing the first sunset and second sunrise. Roosters are confused, crowing for both sunrises.

Demographic evolution

References

Frazioni of Valle Cannobina
Former municipalities of the Province of Verbano-Cusio-Ossola
Cities and towns in Piedmont